Flatiron Flyer is an  express bus system between Denver, Aurora, and Boulder, Colorado, traveling along U.S. Route 36. Different levels of service are available, including a non-stop from Boulder to Union Station in high-occupancy toll lanes (HOT lanes), and all-stop, which serves six park-and-rides along U.S. Route 36 in normal highway lanes. The line branches out to different destinations in Denver, Aurora and Boulder. The Regional Transportation District operates the line, opened on January 3, 2016.

The ITDP classified the system as "not bus rapid transit", due to the use of lanes shared with private cars along US 36, lack of street level boarding/alighting and the lack of an off-board fare system. The system has been criticized of bus rapid transit creep.

Route
A branching route system is employed, with the backbone of the system being the HOT lanes along U.S. Route 36. High-occupancy vehicles and buses travel free in the HOT lanes, while single-occupancy vehicles must pay between $1.25 to $7.60, depending on time of day, or up to $13.68 without an electronic toll collection pass. Union Station and Civic Center in Denver and Anschutz Medical Campus in Aurora serve as the southern termini, while Downtown Boulder and Boulder Junction are the northern termini.

Given that the Flatiron Flyer travels with other vehicles in the HOT lanes, the lack of street level boarding and alighting, and the lack of an off-board fare system, it has been classified as "Not BRT" by the Institute for Transportation and Development Policy, which promotes construction of BRT systems. This new system has been criticized as bus rapid transit creep.The original FasTracks plan approved by voters indicated that center-line BRT stations would be created to avoid buses exiting the highway and sitting at traffic intersections.  However, this plan was shelved and three of the stops were redesigned to use slip ramps instead.

Subsequent plans to give buses the right to use the shoulder as a travel lane during traffic jams required a change in law; RTD buses got the go-ahead in March 2016, and took effect in April of that year.

Stops 
There are six park-and-rides along U.S. Route 36 from Denver to Boulder, which have been dubbed "stations", that will be served by Flatiron Flyer:
 US 36 – Sheridan (1,310 parking spaces)
 US 36 – Church Ranch (394 parking spaces)
 US 36 – Broomfield (pedestrian bridge, 940 parking spaces)
 US 36 – Flatiron (264 parking spaces)
 US 36 – McCaslin (pedestrian bridge, 466 parking spaces)
 US 36 – Table Mesa (pedestrian bridge, 824 parking spaces)

These stops have ticket vending machines, and passenger information systems.

Service 
Express service between Boulder and Denver is expected to take slightly under an hour, which is about 10 to 15 minutes faster than current bus routes.

There was some opposition to the proposed consolidation of routes between Boulder and Denver. Buses along the most popular routes would come more frequently under the new service plan, but Boulder Junction would receive less service.

Service plan 
Headways along different routes vary based on the time of day.

History 
Flatiron Flyer was constructed as part of the FasTracks program, which built six new commuter rail, light rail, and bus rapid transit lines in the Denver metropolitan area.

Widening U.S. Route 36 to accommodate the bus line was a joint project between the Colorado Department of Transportation and RTD, termed the US 36 Express Lanes Project. To accommodate the lanes, several bridges were replaced and shoulders were widened. As part of the multi-modal commitment, a concrete trail was added between Westminster and Table Mesa, the U.S. 36 Bikeway. The project was completed in two phases. The first phase, from Federal Boulevard to 88th Street in Louisville/Superior, took three years (July 2012 - July 2015) and cost $317 million. Phase 2 of the project extended the HOT lanes from 88th Street to Table Mesa Drive in Boulder through a public–private partnership; it opened on January 3, 2016, with toll collection starting in March of that year.

Fleet 
In June 2015, RTD announced the $35 million purchase of 59 MCI D-Series motorcoaches, each of these  buses can carry up to 57 passengers.

In August 2015, the University of Colorado (CU) paid $5 million over five years to place advertisements on Flatiron Flyer buses, with an option to extend for another five years. The deal also included the naming rights for the DIA rail line, dubbed the University of Colorado A Line.

Criticism
RTD opened the first segment of this rail line, the B Line, from Union Station to Westminster Station — near 71st Ave. and Federal Blvd. — in July 2016. The completion of the originally-planned route from Westminster to Longmont has been delayed until 2044 due to lower tax revenues and higher costs than expected. RTD introduced "Flatiron Flyer" as its brand for the US 36 Bus Rapid Transit component of FasTracks, serving travelers between Denver and Boulder. As an interim measure until Northwest Rail can be completed, RTD committed to study high-speed bus options in other parts of the corridor as well as the possibility of extending the North Metro Line to Longmont. The consolidation of current express service between Denver and Boulder into the Flatiron Flyer system attracted criticism from Boulder residents, since increased frequencies would be balanced with some service cuts. Additionally, the ITDP classifies the system as "not bus rapid transit", due to the use of lanes shared with private cars along US 36.

References

External links 

Bus rapid transit in the United States
Bus transportation in Colorado
Transportation in Denver
Transportation in Boulder County, Colorado